Andrew Robert Gosney (born 8 November 1963) is an English former professional footballer who played as a goalkeeper. He made 70 appearances in the Football League playing for Portsmouth, York City, Birmingham City and Exeter City. He represented England at youth level.

Career
Gosney was born in Southampton, Hampshire, and began his football career as an apprentice with Portsmouth in 1979. He turned professional in November 1981, but never established himself as first choice for the club because of the consistency of Alan Knight. Over a 13-year career with the club Gosney made only 60 first-team appearances in all competitions. He spent a month on loan at York City in 1991 before eventually leaving Portsmouth to join Birmingham City at the start of the 1992–93 season. After one unsuccessful season with Birmingham, at the end of which the club brought in Kevin Miller from Exeter City to replace him, Gosney moved in the opposite direction. He was stretchered off during his only appearance for Exeter, a 6–4 home defeat to Reading, with an injury that ended his career.

Gosney was credited by Anderton himself as the man who gave Darren Anderton the "Sicknote" nickname.

References

1963 births
Living people
Footballers from Southampton
English footballers
England youth international footballers
Association football goalkeepers
English Football League players
Portsmouth F.C. players
York City F.C. players
Birmingham City F.C. players
Exeter City F.C. players